Eareckson Station is a census-designated place (CDP) covering the residential population of Eareckson Air Station on the island of Shemya in the Aleutians West Census Area, Alaska, United States. The population at the 2020 Census was 232.

Demographics

It first appeared as the Shemya Air Force Base in the United States Census from 1960 to 1980. As Shemya in 1960 (an unincorporated military base) and as Shemya (Air Force) Station in 1970. In 1980, it was made a census-designated place (CDP). It was dissolved as a CDP in 1990 and did not report separately again until 2020 as Eareckson Station CDP.

2020 census

Note: the US Census treats Hispanic/Latino as an ethnic category. This table excludes Latinos from the racial categories and assigns them to a separate category. Hispanics/Latinos can be of any race.

References

Census-designated places in Aleutians West Census Area, Alaska